Zoe Venditozzi (born 1975) is a novelist and writer living and working in Scotland.  Venditozzi was born in Lancashire and grew up in a small village in North East Fife and studied at  University of Glasgow, She won the Guardian newspaper’s Not the Booker popular prize in 2013 for her first novel 'Anywhere's Better Than Here'. She leads the Witches of Scotland campaign with Claire Mitchell QC, teaches  creative writing workshops and is a teacher of Support for Learning.

Despite growing up in Fife Venditozzi admits that she knew very little of the history of witches in the area before launching the campaign. Scotland , and Fife in particular were  prone to witch hunts. Historians at University of Edinburgh  have created  a database survey of Scottish Witchcraft  to record the men, women and their trials. Venditozzi gained a high profile as part of the Witches of Scotland campaign and is an invited speaker at Scottish literary events such as the Soutar and Paisley Book festivals

References 

Scottish writers
Scottish women writers
Scottish novelists
Living people
1975 births
Alumni of the University of Glasgow